Leptodactylus magistris is a species of frog in the family Leptodactylidae.
It is endemic to Venezuela.
Its natural habitats are subtropical or tropical moist montane forests, rivers, freshwater marshes, and intermittent freshwater marshes.
It is threatened by habitat loss.

References

magistris
Amphibians described in 1997
Taxonomy articles created by Polbot